Davis Street is the name of several streets:

Davis Street, Scranton, Pennsylvania and Taylor, Pennsylvania
 Davis Street, Hong Kong
 Davis Street (San Francisco, California)
 Davis Street (Portland, Oregon)